Joseph Breen (1888–1965) was the American film censor in charge of the Production Code Administration.

Joseph Breen may also refer to:

 Joe Breen (1897–1978), Canadian football player